National Egyptian E-Learning University (EELU) is a non-profit Egyptian National University, and the first Egyptian university to offer E-Learning services. EELU was established with the Decree, No. 233, of the President of the Arab Republic of Egypt on 16 August, 2008 providing distance education through 24-hour online learning.

References

 EELU Homepage

External links
 EELU Homepage
 EELU Students online community

Education in Cairo
Universities in Egypt
Educational institutions established in 2008
2008 establishments in Egypt